Islampur is an Upazila of Jamalpur District  in the Division of Mymensingh, Bangladesh.

Geography
It has 51671 households and total area 343.02 km2.

Demographics

According to the 2011 Bangladesh census, Islampur Upazila had 74,963 households and a population of 298,429, 12.9% of whom lived in urban areas. 12.2% of the population was under the age of 5. The literacy rate (age 7 and over) was 30.1%, compared to the national average of 51.8%.

Points of interest
1. Jamuna River Bank (Guthail Bazar)
2. Laochapra Obokas Kendro (Laochapra, Boksigang)
3. Bambrapurto river side, Ambaria, Islampur
4. Debraipach Bridge

Administration
Islampur,  formed as a Thana in 1914, was turned into an upazila in 1983.

Islampur Upazila is divided into Islampur Municipality and 12 union parishads: Belghacha, Char Gualini, Char Putimari, Chinaduli, Gaibandha, Gualerchar, Islampur, Kulkandi, Noarpara, Palabandha, Partharshi, and Shapdari. The union parishads are subdivided into 58 mauzas and 130 villages.

Education 
Major educational institutes in the upazila include the following:-

1. Mahalgiri Sarkar Para Islamia Dakhil Madrasah.

2. Saverchar V.S.A Darusunnah Dakhil Madrasah

3. Guthail Sinior Alim Madrasha

4. Al Hera Ideal Academy

5. Ghaibandha Shurujjhan High School

6. Shajeda Mahmud High School

7. Morakandi Nosimon Nesa Dakhil Madrasha

8. Chinaduli Fazil Madrasha

9. Kulkandi shamsunnahar High School

10. Islampur Nekjahan Pilot Model High school

11. Islampur Gov. University College

12. Islampur JJKM Girls School and College

13. Islampur High School

14. Kulkandi ABS High School

15. Surjomukhi Bidapith School

16. Islampur M.A. Samad Parvez Mohila Degree College

17. Chinaduly High School

18. Guthail High School and College

19. Goalerchar High School

20. Hargila High School

See also
Upazilas of Bangladesh
Districts of Bangladesh
Divisions of Bangladesh

References

Upazilas of Jamalpur District